Souvenirs is a studio album by John Prine, released in 2000. Originally intended for German-only release, the album consists of new performances of some of Prine's most popular early songs.

Critical reception
AllMusic critic Zac Johnson wrote that "John Prine's contemporary touches on these old favorites may provide new insights, but the new versions rarely surpass the originals." Country Standard Time called the album "an endearing, entertaining stopgap for fans waiting to hear new gems from this talented songwriter." The Arkansas Democrat-Gazette called it "a gem," writing that the songs exist "in their spare, acoustic glory with only the rough edges of Prine’s voice to guide you." The Irish Times called it "a stunning reminder" of "Prine's consistently intelligent take on how to tell a story."

Track listing
All tracks composed by John Prine.

"Souvenirs" – 3:42
"Fish and Whistle" – 3:00
"Far from Me" – 5:09
"Angel from Montgomery" – 5:07
"Donald and Lydia" – 4:09
"Christmas in Prison" – 3:37
"Storm Windows" – 4:26
"Grandpa Was a Carpenter" – 2:52
"The Late John Garfield Blues" – 3:46
"Blue Umbrella" – 3:53
"Six O'Clock News" – 4:36
"People Puttin' People Down" – 4:00
"Sam Stone" – 4:39
"Please Don't Bury Me" – 3:06
"Hello in There" – 4:57

Personnel
John Prine – vocals, guitar
Stuart Basore – pedal steel guitar
Shawn Camp – fiddle
Paul Griffith – drums, percussion
Pat McLaughlin – harmony vocals
Phil Parlapiano – organ, mandolin, piano, accordion
Jason Wilber – mandolin, guitar

References

2000 albums
John Prine albums
Oh Boy Records albums